Enrique Benito Accorsi Teuthorn (22 September 1916 – 28 April 1990) was a Chilean fencer. He competed in the individual foil and épée events at the 1948 Summer Olympics.

References

External links
 

1916 births
1990 deaths
Chilean male foil fencers
Olympic fencers of Chile
Fencers at the 1948 Summer Olympics
Sportspeople from Concepción, Chile
Chilean male épée fencers
20th-century Chilean people